The Zhangjiakou South railway station (formerly Shalingzi West railway station) is a railway station on the Beijing–Baotou railway located in Zhangjiakou, Hebei which was initially meant for only freight traffic and was opened for civilian use in late 2017 to service the trains that were originally meant to arrive and depart from Zhangjiakou railway station.

History
Zhangjiakou railway station was opened on December 30, 2015. At the time, it only handled the technical operation of freight trains. The Zhangtang railway freight engineers used this station to switch shifts. The upstream railway station is Kongjiazhuang railway station. The downstream railway station is Zhaochuan North railway station.

Opening for passenger use
On November 12, 2017, the trains that were originally meant to arrive and depart from Zhangjiakou railway station were moved here due to reconstruction. Currently, Shalingzi West railway station is the main station for people living in the Zhangjiakou area.

Renaming of the station
On March 3, 2019, the station was renamed to Zhangjiakou South railway station and the original Zhangjiakou South railway station was renamed to Zhangjiakou railway station.

Interior
The station covers around 1,000 square meters. Within the station the ticket office and the waiting room are both connected within one big hall, only being separated by the ticket checking gate.

Transportation
Because Zhangjiakou South railway station is much farther away from the city center than the Zhangjiakou railway station, the bus routes 1, 10, 11 and 33 were extended to arrive at this destination. Also an additional new express bus line between the two stations was opened. Passengers can take this bus to arrive to and depart from either railway station.

See also

List of stations on Jingbao railway

References

Notes

External links

Railway stations in Hebei
Railway stations in China opened in 2015